Dragan Nešić (born 31 July 1970 in Serbia) is a volleyball coach from Serbia. He is the coach of CSM Târgoviște. He first coached Serbian team OK Crvena Zvezda at the age of 24.

Career
  CEV Challenge CUP:
  Winner (1): Women's CEV Challenge Cup 2008-09 - Monte Schiavo Banca Marche Jesi
  Women's European Volleyball Championship:
  Third (1): Women's European Volleyball Championship 2007 - National Team Bulgaria Women

References

Living people
1970 births
Serbian volleyball coaches
Sportspeople from Belgrade
Galatasaray S.K. (women's volleyball) coaches
Galatasaray S.K. (men's volleyball) coaches